The 2017–18 Ottawa Senators season was the 26th season of the Ottawa Senators of the National Hockey League (NHL). The Senators failed to return to the Stanley Cup playoffs after advancing to game seven of the Eastern Conference Final in the 2017 playoffs.

Team business
The team moved their American Hockey League (AHL) affiliate team, the Binghamton Senators, to Belleville, Ontario, becoming the Belleville Senators for the 2017–18 season.

The team completed some work on the Canadian Tire Centre in time for the season. The team reduced seating in the upper bowl while adding a stage and special event areas. Team president Tom Anselmi explained the changes in part as that the Centre had too many upper bowl seats and not enough lower bowl seating. The team and Senators fans had been criticized during the 2017 playoffs for not selling out every playoff game. The seating capacity was reduced to 17,000 (standing areas were retained). After the season, Eugene Melnyk stated that he thought the move was a mistake and the tarps over the seats in the upper bowl would be removed for next season.

In January 2018, the Senators reached an agreement with the National Capital Commission government agency in Ottawa to redevelop the downtown LeBreton Flats site. As part of the redevelopment, the Senators would build a new ice hockey arena to replace the Canadian Tire Centre, an arena considered by many fans to be remote and having access problems. A new arena is not expected to open before 2022.

In February 2018, team president Anselmi resigned his position with the Senators, without explanation. The same day, the Senators extended the contract of general manager Pierre Dorion by three years, given the task by owner Melnyk to rebuild the team as necessary.

A group of fans, disappointed in the team in general and owner Melnyk in particular, organized the "#MelnykOut" campaign to prod Melnyk into selling the team or otherwise not be involved with the team. Billboards promoting the "#MelnykOut" campaign were crowd-funded and located around Ottawa. Melnyk and Dorion held "town-hall" meetings with season ticket subscribers after the season in an effort to win back the fan base. The club announced a reduction in parking rates, concession incentives and the removal of the tarps from seats in the arena. Melnyk told the fans that the team was not for sale.  Former captain Daniel Alfredsson later told former Ottawa Sun columnist Susan Sherring that he and Ottawa Mayor Jim Watson were in agreement that "it was time for a new owner." Asked about Alfredsson's comments, NHL Commissioner Gary Bettman stated that the club was not for sale, that Melnyk was "committed to the Senators and is passionate about them."

In May 2018, the club announced the appointment of Nicolas Ruszkowski as its new chief operating officer. Ruszkowski has a background in public relations. Ruszkowski will be in charge of business operations and will not have a role in hockey operations.

In June 2018, Melnyk negotiated a  refinancing of a long-term loan on the franchise. At the same time, Melnyk had to comment on rumours that he had received an offer for the franchise and turned it down, stating that the team was not for sale and no negotiations had occurred.

Off-season
On June 14, 2017, the Senators announced that long-time winger Chris Neil would not be re-signed and he became a free agent on July 1. Neil had played over 1,000 games for the Senators since being drafted by the team in 1998, accumulating 2,522 penalty minutes during this time, the 20th-most of any player in league history. Neil would not be signed by any other NHL team and he chose to retire. He was honoured by the Senators with a ceremony at the January 25, 2018, Senators' home game.

On July 1, 2017, former Senators team captain Daniel Alfredsson announced that he was stepping down in his role as senior advisor of hockey operations. He said that he wanted to take a complete break from the game to spend time with his family. Alfredsson held the role for two seasons.

The team had a significant turnover in personnel. Senators did not resign forwards Chris Kelly, Tommy Wingels or Viktor Stalberg, and lost Clarke MacArthur to long-term injury related to his ongoing issues with concussions. Defenceman Marc Methot was lost to the Vegas Golden Knights through the 2017 NHL Expansion Draft. Kelly would later join the Senators' Belleville affiliate. The Senators signed free agents Johnny Oduya and Nate Thompson.

Pre-season
On June 16, 2017, the Senators announced their pre-season schedule. They played a six-game schedule starting September 18, including a home-and-home set against their provincial rivals, the Toronto Maple Leafs, and a game against the New Jersey Devils in O'Leary, Prince Edward Island, as part of Kraft Hockeyville on September 25. The team also played two games against their closest geographical rival, the Montreal Canadiens, and one game against the Winnipeg Jets.

Regular season
The Senators' home opener was against the Washington Capitals on October 5. On November 10 and November 11, the Senators played two games against the Colorado Avalanche in Stockholm, Sweden. This marked the first time an NHL regular season game has been played outside of North America since 2011.

The Senators made a major trade on November 5, 2017. The team traded Kyle Turris, Andrew Hammond, Shane Bowers and draft picks to the Colorado Avalanche for Matt Duchene, who had requested a trade from the Avalanche. Turris was moved by the Avalanche to the Nashville Predators in a second phase of the deal. Turris had been in unsuccessful salary negotiations with the Senators and turned down a contract offer from the Senators which was similar to one he accepted from the Predators. Hammond had been playing for the Senators' minor league Belleville team, and the Senators wanted to clear his contract. Hammond would remain with Belleville after the trade and was eventually elevated by the Avalanche. Bowers was the Senators' 2017 first round entry draft pick, playing in NCAA ice hockey.

To mark the NHL's centennial, the Senators hosted the "NHL 100 Classic" outdoor game on December 16 at TD Place Stadium in Ottawa. The game between Ottawa and the Montreal Canadiens comes nearly 100 years after the first game of the NHL's 1917–18 season, between the Ottawa Senators and the Montreal Canadiens. The regular season game was also a Canada 150 event. The stadium's capacity was increased with temporary stands, which were also used for the 105th Grey Cup game to be held a few weeks earlier. The Senators had hoped to host the event on Parliament Hill, but the Government of Canada decided it was not feasible. An alumni game was held at an NHL-sized rink installed on Parliament Hill. In the 100 Classic, the Senators defeated the Canadiens 3–0. The game was preceded by controversial comments by owner Eugene Melnyk about the team's attendance, the move to Lebreton Flats and a possible move of the team.

The Senators began the season without captain Erik Karlsson, who had had off-season surgery, and he returned late in October, at less than 100%, but the team managed to have a winning record in October. After the trade for Duchene, the Senators played the games against the Avalanche in Sweden, winning both. The rest of November was unkind, as the Senators then lost seven in a row, one in overtime. December was also a losing month, as the Senators had five-game and four-game losing streaks and won only one game of eight on the road. January saw the Senators lose six in a row, the first time the team had lost six in a row in regulation since 1996.

As the trade deadline of February 26 approached, the Senators were still well outside of a playoff spot. After having his contract extended, general manager Dorion went to work to rebuild the roster. The Senators traded Chris DiDomenico to the Chicago Blackhawks and Dion Phaneuf and Nate Thompson to the Los Angeles Kings. Derick Brassard went to the Pittsburgh Penguins in a three-team swap with the Vegas Golden Knights. Defenceman Johnny Oduya went to the Philadelphia Flyers via waivers. The Senators notified other teams that they would consider offers for team captain Erik Karlsson, and also suggested a package including Bobby Ryan, but neither player was traded. GM Dorion later stated he would not trade Karlsson at the 2018 NHL Entry Draft and would offer him an eight-year extension on his contract on July 1, 2018, the first day the team is allowed to do so.

Playoffs
The Senators were eliminated from playoff contention on March 22, 2018.

Standings

Schedule and results

Pre-season
The pre-season schedule was announced on June 16, 2017.

Regular season
The regular season schedule was released on June 22, 2017.

Players

Statistics
Final Stats
Skaters

Goaltenders

†Denotes player spent time with another team before joining the Senators.  Stats reflect time with the Senators only.
‡No longer with team.
Bold denotes team leader in that category.

Awards

Milestones

Transactions

Trades

Free agents acquired

Free agents lost

|}

Claimed via waivers

Lost via waivers

Player signings

Suspensions/fines

Draft picks

The Senators participated in the 2017 NHL Entry Draft, which was held on June 23–24, 2017 at the United Center in Chicago, Illinois.

Draft notes:
 The Calgary Flames' second-round pick went to the Ottawa Senators as the result of a trade on March 1, 2017 that sent Curtis Lazar and Mike Kostka to Calgary in exchange for Jyrki Jokipakka and this pick.

Notes
1.The Senators did not play in the 2004–05 season due to the lockout.

References

Ottawa Senators seasons
Ottawa Senators
Ottawa
2010s in Ottawa
2017 in Ontario
2018 in Ontario